The Formox process produces formaldehyde. Formox is a registered trademark owned by Johnson Matthey. The process was originally invented jointly by Swedish chemical company Perstorp and Reichhold Chemicals .

Industrially, formaldehyde is produced by catalytic oxidation of methanol. The most commonly used catalysts are silver metal or a mixture of an iron oxide with molybdenum and/or vanadium. In the recently more commonly used Formox process using iron oxide and molybdenum and/or vanadium, methanol and oxygen react at 300-400°C to produce formaldehyde according to the chemical equation:

CH3OH + ½ O2 → H2CO + H2O.

The silver-based catalyst is usually operated at a higher temperature, about 650 °C. On it, two chemical reactions simultaneously produce formaldehyde: the one shown above, and the dehydrogenation reaction:

CH3OH → H2CO + H2

Further oxidation of the formaldehyde product during its production usually gives formic acid that is found in formaldehyde solution, found in parts per million values.

References

Chemical processes